Herbert Kupferberg (1918 – February 22, 2001) was an American music critic and senior editor of Parade Magazine.

Career
Kupferberg earned master's degree in English and journalism from Columbia University. For more than twenty years, he was an editor and critic for the New York Herald Tribune. After its demise in 1966, he joined Parade. He also wrote reviews for The Atlantic and the National Observer.

Writing
He published several books, including Those Fabulous Philadelphians: The Life and Times of a Great Orchestra (1970) and  Amadeus: A Mozart Mosaic (1986). Other books include:

 The Mendelssohns: Three Generations of Genius, 1972
 Felix Mendelssohn: His Life, His Family, His Music, 1972
 A Rainbow of Sound: The Instruments of the Orchestra and Their Music, with Morris Warman's photographs, 1973
 Tanglewood, 1976
 Opera, 1979
 Basically Bach: A 300th Birthday Celebration, 1985
 Book of Classical Music Lists, 1988

Death
On February 22, 2001, Kupferberg died aged 83 in New York City. He was survived by his wife, Barbara; two sons, Seth and Joel; a daughter, Natalie; and four grandchildren.

References

External links
New York Times obituary

1918 births
2001 deaths
American magazine editors
American music critics
Opera critics
20th-century American non-fiction writers
20th-century American male writers
American male non-fiction writers
Columbia University alumni